Ibrahim Bey or İbrahim Bey may refer to:

 Bedreddin I. İbrahim Bey (ruled 1312–1333 and 1348–1349), bey of Karaman
 Tacettin Ibrahim Bey (ruled 1443–1461), Isfendiyarid prince
 İbrahim II of Karaman aka Damad II (?–1464), bey of Karaman
 Ibrahim of the Ottoman Empire (1615-1648), Turkish sultan
 Ibrahim Bey (Mamluk) (1735–1817), Mamluk chieftain in Egypt
 Ibrahim Pasha of Egypt (1789–1848), Egyptian general and ruler
 Ibrahim Bey (Constantine), Algerian ruler of Constantine, Algeria (1822-1824).
 Avraamy Aslanbegov aka Ibrahim bey Aslanbeyov (1822–1900), Azeri admiral and military author
 Ibrahim bey Usubov (1872–1920), Azeri general
 Cihangirzade İbrahim Bey (1874-1948), Turkish military officer and statesman
 İbrahim Çolak (officer) (1881-1944), Turkish military officer
 Kamel Ibrahim Bey, Egyptian Minister of Foreign Affairs from 1935 to 1936